Leo John Molloy (born 1956) is a New Zealand businessman and former veterinarian. He has been a controversial and polarising figure for his outspoken views.

Early life
Molloy was born in the West Coast town of Moana. He is of Irish descent. Television producer Julie Christie is his sister. Their father Kevin had a stroke when Molloy was 7 years old, after which they moved to the small town of Moonlight. Kevin died a few years later. Molloy left school at 15 and became an apprentice jockey. He stopped horse riding after four years and took a few years to travel. In the United Kingdom, he was a stable hand at Queen Elizabeth II's stables. He applied to study veterinary medicine at Massey University but was rejected due to insufficient academics, so he returned to New Zealand and attended Greymouth High School as an adult. He would later brag about having sex with both teachers and students. He then successfully attended and graduated from Massey, later opening his own veterinary practice.

Hospitality career
Molloy and his first wife took ownership of the Fat Ladies Arms bar in Palmerston North in 1991. The changes they made to the music and interior were greatly successful, leading them to franchise the brand out to nine locations. After moving to Auckland, Molloy opened the restaurant Euro on 3 August 1999, at the cost of 1.3 million dollars. He sold Euro in 2002.

He later opened Danny Doolan's, an Irish pub.

In April 2002, Molloy opened a nightclub called Cardiac, at the cost of roughly 2.5 million dollars. Molloy stated there was a secret “naughty bar” through the unisex toilets, "so if you wanted to shag, you could do it.” Cardiac went into receivership in June 2003, and Molloy was declared bankrupt in November, being more than a million dollars in debt.

A chance meeting with Viaduct Harbour boss Mark Wyborn rekindled Molloy's career. Wyborn helped him open a bar named Cowboys, which was successful enough to open a second location in Queenstown. He later opened a bar next door named Indians. He also had a short-lived bar called Harry's Place, named after his eldest son.

In 2006, Molloy and his wife Ingrid registered the Fokker Brothers trademark, intended for use as a pizza restaurant and then later a steakhouse and sports bar. Following the end of their marriage, Molloy applied to revoke the original trademark, and opened a Fokker Brothers burger restaurant in 2015 with his sister Julie. His application was denied.

In 2017, Molloy opened the HeadQuarters bar, again with the help of Wyborn, just in time for the 2017 British & Irish Lions tour to New Zealand. He later opened another bar, Little HeadQuarters. During the COVID-19 pandemic, HeadQuarters turned away customers over the age of 70. Molloy planned to "segregate" unvaccinated staff members with different coloured uniforms, rather than firing them. In February 2022, Molloy announced he would be closing HeadQuarters to focus on his election campaign.

2022 Auckland mayoral election
Molloy's campaign for the 2022 Auckland mayoral election was announced on 12 July 2021. He has been advised by former National Party president and personal friend Michelle Boag and activist Matt McCarten. He vowed to halt any development of light rail in Auckland. He is in favour of a congestion charge of $3.50.

On 17 June 2022, Molloy claimed on The AM Show, the National Party had offered to endorse his mayoral campaign and said that Viv Beck should leave the race. When asked who specifically he had been talking to, Molloy did not identify any individuals, replying "everybody". A spokesperson for National leader Christopher Luxon stated they weren't sure who Molloy was referring to and that they had not endorsed him. The National Party-aligned Communities and Residents local body group endorsed Viv Beck on 12 July 2022.

Molloy withdrew from the race on 12 August after polling showed him falling to third place behind his opponents Efeso Collins and Wayne Brown.

Controversies and legal issues
Molloy was charged with assault in December 2001, after an altercation with a staff member at a restaurant owned by Molloy's brother-in-law.

In January 2002, Molloy was fined by the Employment Court of New Zealand for abusive behaviour towards a waitress at his Euro restaurant. Molloy had publicly berated her and then assaulted her when she attempted to write down what he was saying to her. The waitress also alleged sexual and racial harassment.

In 2009, Molloy hired former boxer Sean Sullivan to intimidate celebrity astrologer Don Murray into removing content from his website which Molloy found insulting to his friends.

In 2014, a defamation suit brought against Molloy by horse racing executive Greg Purcell was settled for a six figure sum and an apology from Molloy.

In June 2018, Molloy posted a diatribe against Rugby League supporters on Facebook, stating league was a "bogan game of criminals and sons of criminals" and "mongrel scum and vandals support league".

In 2019, a woman on Facebook asked if HeadQuarters served vegan food. The HeadQuarters page responded mockingly, offering to feed her the cardboard menu and rabbit food. Molloy denied being the one to make the comment, claiming it was a senior staff member attempting to mimic Molloy's caustic style.

In May 2019, he rallied against the TV show The Project over their coverage of a customer complaint, saying “I will do whatever it takes to hurt people until I really hurt you badly… I will seek to extract maximum revenge in every way possible.”

In June 2019, Molloy told journalist Duncan Greive that he knew Bernie Monk, the father of a Pike Mine disaster victim and although he felt 'sorry for him', he 'has this craven desire to be in the media' and has 'milked it in the extreme'.

In February 2020, Molloy was prosecuted for breaching the name suppression of Jesse Kempson, the man accused of killing British tourist Grace Millane, on 22 November 2019, the day he was found guilty. After initially entering a plea of not guilty, Molloy changed his plea to guilty in June 2020. In April 2021, he was sentenced to 350 hours of community service and a $15,000 fine. In August 2021 Molloy unsuccessfully appealed his conviction and sentence.

In May 2020, Molloy attracted controversy when, in a screed against Prime Minister Jacinda Ardern for her COVID-19 restrictions, he claimed that a recent outbreak in South Korea was caused by "gay dungeon bars". He was also accused of homophobia for a sign posted at the urinals in HeadQuarters which instructed Labour and Green Party voters not to hold the penis of the man next to them. He later went on to say that Ardern and Director-General of Health Ashley Bloomfield "deserve to be harassed" and repeated false claims of an increase in suicides during lockdown.

In July 2020, Molloy received a fine and one year ban from the horse racing industry for insulting and abusive language used towards officials.

In March 2022, Molloy stated the council should install hosing systems in the central city to get rid of "drunks" and "undesirables".

Personal life
Molloy is Catholic. He married his first wife in 1991. The relationship ended in 1998 after Molloy had an affair. He married his second wife Ingrid in 2000. They had five children. This marriage ended in December 2013.

References

1956 births
Living people
People from the West Coast, New Zealand
New Zealand people of Irish descent
People educated at Greymouth High School
Massey University alumni
New Zealand veterinarians
New Zealand restaurateurs
Businesspeople from Auckland
New Zealand Catholics
New Zealand political candidates